Serra da Malcata Nature Reserve is a Portuguese nature reserve. It was created in 1981 as a way to protect the then existent populations of Iberian Lynx and in 1988, it was made a special protected area for birds.

References

Nature reserves in Portugal
Geography of Castelo Branco District
Geography of Guarda District
Tourist attractions in Castelo Branco District
Tourist attractions in Guarda District
Natura 2000 in Portugal